Seven Keys Group Pty. Ltd. was an Australian film distribution company founded in 1969 by Andrew Gaty. In 1975, it became the largest independent institution of its kind in that country, outgrossing every local unit of Hollywood's studios there.

Its library contained titles from ITC Entertainment, RSO and New Line Cinema among others.

In 1985, Gaty sold the company to the Perry Corporation. In December of that same year, the company saw the release of Nelvana's The Care Bears Movie (distributed in the United States by The Samuel Goldwyn Company).

The company also had a branch in the United Kingdom during the 1970s.

References

Mass media companies established in 1969
Defunct companies of Australia
Film distributors of Australia